The Atlantic Coast League (ACL), based in Gastonia, North Carolina, was a professional, independent baseball league located in the Southeastern United States.  It operated in cities not served by Major or Minor League Baseball teams and was not affiliated with either.  Founded in 1994, the league would fold less than a month into its first season of 1995. The league folded due to low attendance and an overall lack of financial stability.

All-time results

Proposed teams
Anderson, South Carolina
Orangeburg, South Carolina
Sumter, South Carolina

References

Defunct independent baseball leagues in the United States
Atlantic Coast League
Defunct minor baseball leagues in the United States